Bevier Memorial Building is a historic institutional building built originally for the Rochester Athaneaum and Mechanics Institute located at Rochester in Monroe County, New York. It is a three and a half brick story with ceramic trim designed by Claude Fayette Bragdon and completed in 1910.

The building's namesake Susan Bevier (1821-1903), widow of Henry H. Bevier, gifted the Institute approximately $275,000 for its construction in her will.

It was listed on the National Register of Historic Places in 1973.

References

External links

Office buildings in Rochester, New York
University and college buildings on the National Register of Historic Places in New York (state)
Buildings and structures completed in 1910
National Register of Historic Places in Rochester, New York
1910 establishments in New York (state)

Rochester Institute of Technology